The men's 4 × 10 km relay cross-country skiing competition at the 1992 Winter Olympics in Albertville, France, took place on 18 February at Les Saisies. The race saw Norway beat Italy by 1 minute 26.7 seconds, with Finland finishing third.

Results
Sources:

References

External links
Results International Ski Federation (FIS)

Men's cross-country skiing at the 1992 Winter Olympics
Men's 4 × 10 kilometre relay cross-country skiing at the Winter Olympics